Splashwater Kingdom can refer to:
Six Flags The Great Escape & Splashwater Kingdom
Splashwater Kingdom at Six Flags Kentucky Kingdom